Marvin Leonard Shore (April 13, 1929 – September 27, 2019) was a Canadian politician, who represented London North in the Legislative Assembly of Ontario from 1975 to 1977, originally as a Liberal member.

Shore was born in Toronto, Ontario in 1929.

He was elected in the general election in 1975 as a Liberal member but crossed the floor on October 27, 1976 to join the minority PC government. In the subsequent general election, in 1977, Shore lost to Ron Van Horne, the Liberal candidate. He died at the age of 90 on September 27, 2019.

References

External links 
 

1930 births
2019 deaths
Ontario Liberal Party MPPs
Politicians from Toronto
Progressive Conservative Party of Ontario MPPs